The Tyrell Baronetcy, of Boreham House in the County of Sussex, was a title in the Baronetage of the United Kingdom. It was created on 28 September 1809 for John Tyrell. The second Baronet sat as member of parliament for Essex and Essex North. The title became extinct on his death in 1877.

Tyrell baronets, of Boreham House (1809)
Sir John Tyrell, 1st Baronet (1762–1832)
Sir John Tyssen Tyrell, 2nd Baronet (1795–1877)

See also
 Tyrrell baronets

References

Extinct baronetcies in the Baronetage of the United Kingdom